Emory Leon Chaffee (April 15, 1885 – March 8, 1975) was an American physicist. He was a professor at Harvard University from 1911 to 1953.

Chaffee was born in Somerville, Massachusetts. He studied electrical engineering and received his bachelor's degree from MIT in 1907. Afterward he made further studies at the Harvard University and took his master's degree and his Ph.D.

He was made an instructor in electrical engineering in 1911 and got a position as assistant professor of physics in 1917. In 1923 he became an associate professor and a professor in 1926.  He was appointed Rumford Professor of Physics in 1940, and Gordon McKay Professor of applied physics in 1946.  Chaffee became chairman of the Department of Engineering Sciences and Applied Physics from 1949 till 1952.

Chaffee was awarded the IEEE Medal of Honor in 1959. He was best known for his work on thermionic vacuum tubes.  In 1911 he invented the concept of the Chaffee Gap which was a way of producing continuous oscillations for long-distance telephone transmissions and in 1924 he started to work on controlling weather, using aircraft to break up clouds with electrically charged grains of sands.

Chaffee died in Waltham, Massachusetts.

External links
Oral history interview transcript with Emory Leon Chaffee on 31 January 1964, American Institute of Physics, Niels Bohr Library & Archives

Today in Science History
IEEE
 Geocities.com

1885 births
1975 deaths
20th-century American physicists
20th-century American engineers
Harvard University alumni
Harvard University faculty
IEEE Medal of Honor recipients
MIT School of Engineering alumni